Viscos is a commune in the Hautes-Pyrénées department in south-western France. It is famous for being the setting of Brazilian author Paulo Coelho's 2000 novel The Devil and Miss Prym.

See also
Communes of the Hautes-Pyrénées department

References

Communes of Hautes-Pyrénées